Crossocheilus elegans is a fish species in the genus Crossocheilus from northern Borneo, Indonesia. Its distribution is the Segama and Kinabatangan River drainages in Sabah, Malaysia.

References

External links 
 Crossocheilus elegans on www.fishbase.org (accession: December 2011)

Cyprinid fish of Asia
Freshwater fish of Indonesia
Fish described in 2011
Crossocheilus